Shingetsu is a Japanese progressive rock band from the 1970s. A band with an originally short career, they have typically been categorised as one of the most notable exponents of progressive rock music.

Shingetsu ('new moon') arrived in the Japanese music scene on the late 1970s. Led by the "Japanese Peter Gabriel", Makoto Kitayama (recognized for his deep, wavering, mournful vocals), Shingetsu's cinematic progressive sound gained comparisons to peak-time Genesis and recognition overseas.

Consisting of Kitayama, Akira Hanamoto, Naoya Takahahi, Shizuo Suzuki and Haruhiko Tsuda, the band only produced one studio album in their first run, followed in later years by two live albums, which nevertheless featured some unreleased performances. In 2015 they released an album titled From A Distant Star (originally recorded in 2005), which features songs they had written before breaking up in 1981, and a studio demo they had recorded after completing their first album in 1979.

Their studio album, the eponymous Shingetsu, often considered as a masterpiece of symphonic prog, is abundant in musical arrangements: the tasteful use of soft organ/synth soundscapes, Mellotron, and 12-string guitar passages reminiscent of the UK bands of the 1970s, while Kitayama's vocals give Shingetsu a distinctive edge from western bands.

The band resumed touring sometime around 2014, under the name "Shingetsu Project". While Makoto no longer tours with the band, he does still engage in studio projects with the band.

Disambiguation and meaning 
Disambiguation for the word shingetsu:

Shingetsu is a shakuhachi honkyoku piece from the Dokyoku repertoire.  The word shin means heart, mind, or spirit.  The word getsu means moon, which is a symbol for enlightenment or perfection.  Thus, the name of the piece can be taken to mean heart moon or spirit perfection or enlightenment of the mind.  The piece is the slowest and most quiet in the Dokyoku repertoire.

"Shingetsu" has been recorded by many shakuhachi artists, including Watazumi Doso, Yokoyama Katsuya, and Alcvin Takegawa Ramos.

See also
Makoto Kitayama
Progressive rock

References

External links
"http://shingetsu.tv/" Official site.
"Shingetsu's" discography, mp3 and reviews.
"Shingetsu's" site with downloable mp3 and information.

Japanese progressive rock groups
Symphonic rock groups
Musea artists
Victor Entertainment artists
Musical groups established in 1976
Musical groups disestablished in 1981
Musical groups reestablished in 2005